Leptophis is a genus of colubrid snakes, commonly known as parrot snakes. The species within this genus are widely distributed throughout Mexico, Central and South America.

Description
Snakes of the genus Leptophis are slender with a long tail. The body is cylindrical or slightly laterally compressed. The head is elongated and distinct from the neck.  The eye is large with a round pupil. The dorsal scales are arranged in 15 rows at midbody. The maxillary teeth, which number 20–32, are in a continuous series without any interspace, and are longest posteriorly. Conversely, the mandibular teeth are longest anteriorly.

Species and subspecies
The following species and subspecies are currently recognized as being valid:
Leptophis ahaetulla  – giant parrot snake
Leptophis bocourti 
Leptophis bolivianus 
Leptophis coeruleodorsus  – Oliver's parrot snake
Leptophis cupreus  – copper parrot snake
Leptophis depressirostris  – Cope's parrot snake
Leptophis dibernardoi 
Leptophis diplotropis  - Pacific Coast parrot snake
Leptophis diplotropis diplotropis 
Leptophis diplotropis forreri 
Leptophis liocercus 
Leptophis marginatus 
Leptophis mexicanus  – Mexican parrot snake
Leptophis mexicanus hoeversi 
Leptophis mexicanus mexicanus 
Leptophis mexicanus septentrionalis 
Leptophis mexicanus yucatanensis 
Leptophis modestus  – cloud forest parrot snake
Leptophis nebulosus  – Oliver's parrot snake
Leptophis nigromarginatus  - black-skinned parrot snake
Leptophis occidentalis 
Leptophis praestans 
Leptophis riveti  – Despax's parrot snake
Leptophis stimsoni  – Trinidad upland parrot snake
Leptophis urostictus (

Nota bene: A binomial authority or trinomial authority in parentheses indicates that the species or subspecies was originally described in a genus other than Leptophis.

References

Further reading
Bell T (1825). "On Leptophina, a group of Serpents comprising the Genus Dryinus of Merrem, and a newly formed Genus proposed to be named Leptophis ". Zoological Journal 2: 322–329. (Leptophis, new genus, pp. 328–329.)
https://serpientesdevenezuela.org/leptophis-ahaetulla/
https://serpientesdevenezuela.org/leptophis-coeruleodorsus/

Colubrids
Snake genera
Taxa named by Thomas Bell (zoologist)